Fuck Texas, Sing for Us is a live album released by British rock band New Model Army on 17 November 2008.

The tracks on this album were recorded at a variety of venues during the High tour of 2007/2008. The title of the album is taken from an audience chant that preceded the encore in New Orleans at the Hi Ho Lounge.

Track listing
"Intro" – 0:24
"225" – 4:01
"Nothing Dies Easy" – 4:11
"Island" – 4:40
"Into the Wind" – 4:20
"Breathing" – 4:30
"Rivers" – 5:01
"One of the Chosen" – 4:29
"Bloodsports" – 4:24
"Lust for Power" – 4:04
"No Mirror, No Shadow" – 3:51
"High" – 4:40
"Family" – 4:22
"Vagabonds" – 6:09
"Wired" – 3:22
"Bad Old World" – 4:09
"Masterrace" – 3:13
"Poison Street" – 3:44

Personnel
Justin Sullivan – vocals, guitar
Nelson – bass, vocals
Dean White – keyboards, vocals
Michael Dean – drums, vocals
Marshal Gill – guitar, vocals

References

New Model Army (band) live albums
2008 live albums